Guaribas Biological Reserve is a biological reserve in the state of Paraíba, Brazil.

Location

The  reserve was created on 25 January 1990.
It is administered by the Chico Mendes Institute for Biodiversity Conservation.
The reserve is in the municipalities of Rio Tinto and Mamanguape in the state of Paraíba.

The reserve is on the Borborema Plateau, with slopes that face east and south east.
The terrain is flat, with gentle undulations.
The reserve contains parts of the basins of the Mamanguape and Camaratuba rivers.
It contains the Descanso or Caiana Lagoon, which dries up completely in the dry season.

Ecology

The reserve is in a transition zone between the Atlantic Forest, caatinga and cerrado biomes.
The area is mostly forest-covered, although there are some patches of open cerrado vegetation which once stretched to the coast.
The area has suffered from the removal of timber in some areas, which are now in the process of regeneration. 
There have been frequent incursions by people removing timber and gathering fruit.
Adult and sapling specimens of Caesalpinia echinata (Brazil wood) are common.
Selective illegal logging of this species has opened large clearings in the forest, allowing establishment of pioneer species.

Conservation

The Biological Reserve is a "strict nature reserve" under IUCN protected area category Ia.
The purpose is to fully protect the biota and other natural attributes without human interference.
Specifically, it is to protect one of the last well-preserved remnants of Atlantic Forest in the north east of Brazil, which may be harboring a variety of plant and animal species, and may play an important role in preserving genetic diversity.

Protected species include white-necked hawk (Buteogallus lacernulatus), oncilla (Leopardus tigrinus), black-cheeked gnateater (Conopophaga melanops), rufous gnateater (Conopophaga lineata), buff-throated purpletuft (Iodopleura pipra), blue-crowned motmot (Momotus momota), scalloped antbird (Myrmeciza ruficauda), spot-winged wood quail (Odontophorus capueira), rusty-margined guan (Penelope superciliaris), golden-spangled piculet (Picumnus exilis), white-throated spadebill (Platyrinchus mystaceus)  and plain xenops (Xenops minutus).

References

Sources

1990 establishments in Brazil
Biological reserves of Brazil
Protected areas of Paraíba
Protected areas established in 1990
Protected areas of the Atlantic Forest